The 2005 Rally Australia was the 16th round of the 2005 World Rally Championship. It took place between 10 and 13 November 2005. Citroën's François Duval won the race, his 1st win in the World Rally Championship. This was the first time a Belgian driver had won a WRC event. The rally was the final appearance of the Peugeot, Mitsubishi and Škoda factory teams in the WRC.

Results

References

External links
 Results at ewrc-results.com

Rally Australia, 2005
Australia
Rally Australia